Clive Low Wallace (6 January 1939 – 2008) was a Scottish footballer who played as an inside forward. Wallace began his career in the mid-1950s as a trialist with Dundee United. Wallace featured in a handful of matches before playing a match for United's rivals, Dundee, returning to Tannadice for another four games. From here, Wallace moved to Montrose, before ending the decade with spells at Bury and Stockport County.

After leaving Stockport, Wallace returned to junior football in Scotland with Forfar Celtic.

References

External links
 

1939 births
2008 deaths
Scottish footballers
Scottish Football League players
English Football League players
Dundee United F.C. players
Dundee F.C. players
Montrose F.C. players
Bury F.C. players
Stockport County F.C. players
People from Kirriemuir
Association football inside forwards
Footballers from Angus, Scotland